The following table is the list of newspaper endorsements in the 1992 United States presidential election. It mostly contains major newspapers of 1992, which made their presidential endorsement from September–November 1992. Many newspaper, who had made their endorsement for George H. W. Bush in 1988 presidential election endorsed Bill Clinton in the 1992 election. Harford Courant's 1992 endorsement of Clinton was their first Democratic presidential endorsement in its 228 years of continuous publication.

List of newspaper endorsements

Summary

List

See also 

 1992 United States presidential election
 Bill Clinton 1992 presidential campaign
 George H. W. Bush 1992 presidential campaign
 Ross Perot 1992 presidential campaign
 Newspaper endorsements in the 1996 United States presidential election

Notes and references

Notes

References

Work cited

External links 
 Newspaper presidential endorsements  (archived)

1990s in mass media
Newspaper endorsements
1990s politics-related lists